Power Challenge Holdings Ltd. is a developer and publisher of browser-based multiplayer sports games based in the UK. Initially founded in Sweden as ManagerZone AB, the company changed name to Power Challenge when it expanded its portfolio of games in 2005 to include both ManagerZone and Power Soccer. The company also became known the same year for bringing a 3D game client to ManagerZone, being the first to do so with a web-based football management game. Both ManagerZone and Power Soccer make use of micro transactions, but offer users the option to play free of charge.

Today, Power Challenge Holdings Ltd. owns a group of companies, namely Power Challenge AB  (which in turn owns Power Challenge Sweden AB) and ManagerZone AB. The privately held company is funded by Benchmark, Israel and IQ Capital, UK, and has employees based in New York, London, Italy, and Sweden.

Power Soccer

In Power Soccer, users all around the world could play each other online on a virtual football stadium in an effort to make their team the best. There were different types of play available including tournaments, cups (both basic and clan), a practice area, a beginners area, and friendly matches. Teams would level up as they got XP (experience) by playing matches, with the highest attainable level being 99. Users could also compete in a world rankings list through gaining RP (rank points) for winning matches and losing RP when being defeated. 
Power Soccer closed permanently on May 16, 2016.

ManagerZone
ManagerZone is a football and hockey management game where users play against each other in leagues and cups, managing aspects such as transfers, stadium building, player training, a youth academy, tactics, club economy and more.

References

External links 
 

Software companies of Sweden
Video game companies of Sweden
Companies based in Östergötland County